Pro Kabaddi League (also known as Vivo Pro Kabbadi for sponsorship reasons) or abbreviated to PKL is an Indian men's professional Kabaddi league. It was launched in 2014 and is broadcast on Star Sports. However, Season 8 was postponed due to the COVID-19 pandemic and the season commenced on 22 December 2021.

The league's inception was influenced by the popularity of the Kabaddi tournament at the 2006 Asian Games. The format of the competition was influenced by the Indian Premier League. The Pro Kabaddi League uses a franchise-based model and its first season was held in 2014 with eight teams each of which has paid fees of up to US$250,000 to join.

There were doubts over whether the Pro Kabaddi League would be successful, noting that many leagues were attempting to emulate the IPL's business model and success and that, unlike cricket, there were relatively fewer well-known players in Kabaddi. However, it was also noted that kabaddi was widely played in grassroots community settings, and could thus attract a wide variety of rural and metropolitan viewers for advertisers to target if the league gained significant attraction.

The inaugural season was seen by 43.5 crores (435 million) viewers, second to the 2014 Indian Premier League's 55.2 crores (552 million), while the first season final between Jaipur Pink Panthers and U-Mumba was watched by 8.64 crores (86.4 million). Star Sports, the Pro Kabaddi League's broadcaster, subsequently announced in 2015 that it would acquire a 74% stake in the league's parent company Mashal Sports.

For the 2017 and 2018–19 season, the Pro Kabaddi League added four new teams, and changed its format to split the teams into two divisions known as "zones". Soon the league returned to its regular double round-robin format from the 2019 season.

Format 

The Pro Kabaddi League's rules are similar to that of the indoor team version of Kabaddi, but with additional rules to encourage more scoring. Kabaddi is a contact team sport, played between two teams of seven players.
The objective of the game is for a single player on offence, referred to as a "raider", to run into the opposing team's half of a court, touch out as many of their defenders as possible, and return to their own half of the court, all without being tackled by the defenders, and in a single breath. Points are scored for each player tagged by the raider, while the opposing team earns a point for stopping the raider. Players are taken out of the game if they are touched or tackled, but are brought back in for each point scored by their team from a tags or tackle.
Playing two "empty" raids in a row will trigger a "Do or Die", where the raider must score a point or they will be declared out.
When a defensive side has three or fewer players remaining, tackles scored are termed as "Super Tackle", which is worth two points instead of one.

Seasons

Season 1

The first signing and auction of players for the 8 teams were held on 20 May 2014 in Mumbai. India's national kabaddi captain Rakesh Kumar was the priciest among the players bought for 12.80 lakh by the Patna Pirates. Sports Authority of India's Deepak Niwas Hooda was bought by the Telugu Titans franchise for 12.60 lakh. Tae Deok Eom was the highest paid overseas player bought for 7 lakh by the Patna franchise.

The duration of the season was from 26 July 2014 to 31 August 2014. There were double round-robin matches along with two semifinals, third place and final games. 56 games were to be played in the first round and 4 in the playoff stage, making a total of 60 games. 8 teams took part in the first edition. The first game was played on 26 July between U Mumba and Jaipur Pink Panthers and the final was played on 31 August at Mumbai. Jaipur Pink Panthers beat U Mumba by 35–24 to win the inaugural Pro Kabaddi League.

Season 2

Star Sports Pro Kabaddi season 2 was from 18 July 2015 to 23 August 2015. There were 60 matches played with two semifinals, a third place play-off and a final. The first game was played on 18 July between U Mumba and Jaipur Pink Panthers and the final was played on 23 August at Mumbai between U Mumba and Bengaluru Bulls. U Mumba beat Bengaluru Bulls with the points 36–30 to win the 2015 season of the Pro Kabaddi League. U Mumba stood first, Bengaluru Bulls stood second and Telugu Titans stood in the third position in the league.

Season 3

Star Sports Pro Kabaddi season 3 had two editions. The CEO of Star India, Sanjay Gupta, confirmed that Star Sports Pro Kabaddi wants to make Pro Kabaddi, a 5-week event, happen 10 weeks a year by having two editions a year. The idea is to play the tournament once in January–February 2016 and once in June–July 2016.
It also had 8 teams. Patna Pirates beat U Mumba by 3 points in the final in Delhi to take home the trophy. Puneri Paltan came third this season.

Season 4

The fourth season took place from 25 June to 31 July 2016, with the existing eight teams participating. Patna Pirates beat Jaipur Pink Panthers in the final. Season 4 also saw the launch of the first professional women's kabaddi league, Women's Kabaddi Challenge (WKC). The first season saw 3 teams namely Ice Divas, Fire Birds and Storm Queens battle out to be the first ever WKC champions. In the men's final, Patna Pirates defeated Jaipur Pink Panthers to win the Pro Kabaddi League title for the 2nd time.

Season 5

The 2017 season was the fifth edition of the Pro Kabaddi League, and it featured 12 teams, including new teams from Uttar Pradesh, Haryana, Tamil Nadu, and Gujarat. The team from Haryana is known as Haryana Steelers owned by JSW Sports. Sachin Tendulkar co-owns the Tamil Nadu team named Tamil Thalaivas. The Uttar Pradesh team is named as UP Yoddha owned by GMR group and the Gujarat team is named as Gujarat Fortune Giants owned by Gautam Adani.

Auctions for the new season were held in May, before which the existing teams were allowed to retain one player each. The auction saw over 400 players go under the hammer and ₹46.99 crores spent by the 12 teams.

The Pro Kabaddi League season 5 started on 28 July 2017.

The most expensive pick of the auction was raider Nitin Tomar, who was bought by the Uttar Pradesh team for a sum of ₹93 lakh. Following in second place was Rohit Kumar after the Bengaluru Bulls picked him for a ₹81 lakhs price. The most expensive foreign player was South Korea's Lee Jang-kun after he was retained by the Bengal Warriors for ₹80.3 lakhs.

The new season was slated to be the biggest league tournament of its kind in the history of Indian sports in terms of geographical coverage and duration. It featured 138 matches spread across a time period of 13 weeks across 11 states.

A children's Kabaddi tournament, known as KBD Juniors, was also organised between schools of the cities in which the matches were held.

Patna Pirates beat Gujarat Fortune Giants by 55–38 in the final with the Man of the Tournament Pardeep Narwal stealing the show with 19 raid points against the Fortune Giants defence for the first time in the tournament.

The award ceremony of the finale was hosted by Pooja Bhamrah. Pardeep Narwal was adjudged the man of the finale.

Season 6

The 2018 season is the sixth edition of the Pro Kabaddi League, and it features 12 teams.
Auctions for the new season were held in which Haryana Steelers paid ₹1.51 crores for Monu Goyat who became the highest paid player in the history of Pro Kabaddi league.

The most expensive foreign player this season is Fazel Atrachali from Iran. He was bought by U Mumba for ₹1 crore.

Zone B toppers, Bengaluru Bulls beat the Zone A toppers, Gujarat Fortune Giants by 38–33 in the final with the Man of the Tournament Pawan Kumar Sehrawat stealing the show with a record 22 raid points against the young Fortune Giants defence. For a consecutive second time, Gujarat Fortune Giants have lost in the finals. The coach of Bengaluru Bulls, Randhir Singh was happy as his team finally won the tournament after underwhelming finishes in the previous couple of seasons. On the other hand, Manpreet Singh, the coach of the Gujarat Fortune Giants rued the opportunity to win the tournament after losing two successive finals.

Season 7
The 2019 season is the seventh edition of the Pro Kabaddi League, and it features 12 teams. Auctions for the new season were held in Mumbai on 8 and 9 April. The franchises splashed out over 50 crores to acquire 200 players. Siddharth Sirish Desai became the most expensive buy of the season after Telugu Titans got the winning bid of him at ₹1.45 crore.
The most expensive foreign player of this season was Iranian Mohammad Esmaeil Nabibakhsh who was bought by Bengal Warriors for ₹77.75 lakh.
As termed by the organisers 'Most Toughest Season', the zonal system present in the previous season is removed, and each team will play against all the other teams twice. Top 6 teams will qualify for the playoffs. The top two teams will automatically make the semi-finals while the remaining four will battle it out in eliminators. Dabang Delhi and Bengal Warriors emerged as the winners in the semi finals and qualified to the final for the first time. In the final, Bengal Warriors outplayed Dabang Delhi by a margin of 39–34 and clinched their maiden Pro Kabaddi League title.
The season witnessed several records. Pardeep Narwal became the first ever player to reach 1000 points in the Pro Kabaddi League. Naveen Kumar scored 21 consecutive Super 10s and overall 22. While Pawan Sehrawat registered most individual points in a match (39) against Haryana Steelers. In this season, for the first time three raiders crossed the 300-raid points mark. Among the defenders, Neeraj Kumar of Patna Pirates scored most tackle points (11) in a match and equalled the record of Mohit Chillar (11).

Season 8

The 2021–22 season is the eighth edition of Pro Kabaddi League. The season began on 22 December 2021. The usual travelling caravan format was changed to a single venue hosting all the matches of the season. Kanteerava Indoor Stadium, Bangalore was initially announced as the venue, but was later changed to the Sheraton Grand Hotel and Convention Center located in Whitefield, Bangalore. Dabang Delhi beat Patna Pirates in final to win their maiden PKL title. Naveen Kumar from Delhi created history by winning 2 back to back MVP awards. Bengaluru skipper Pawan Sehrawat successfully defended his best raider crown and won the award for second season in a row. Sehrawat finished the campaign with 18 super raid's and 304 raid points to his name. Iranian left corner, Mohammadreza chiyaneh from team Patna Pirates took the best defender award home for second season in a row. The rookie set a new PKL record with 10 High 5's and 89 tackle points.  Mohit Goyat from pune was name the best new young player.

Season 9 
The 2022 season is the ninth edition of the Pro Kabaddi League. The auction for the season spanned 5-6 August 2022. The most expensive transfer of the season was Pavan Kumar Sehrawat, who was bought by Tamil Thalaivas for Rs 2.26 crore, a record sum for the PKL. The season began on 7 October 2022 and was held with the season divided into three legs, each taking place in a different venue (Kanteerava Indoor Stadium, Shree Shiv Chhatrapati Sports Complex and Gachibowli Indoor Stadium). Jaipur Pink Panthers beat Puneri Paltan 33-29 in the final to become the 2nd team after Patna Pirates to win more than 1 title of the Pro Kabaddi League.

Viewership 
As per the available data of the opening two weeks, Star Sports Pro Kabaddi viewership on TV increased by nearly 56% from the 2014 year's viewership. During the inaugural season, viewership was 43.5 crore (435 million) viewers, which was the second in India after the 56 crore (560 million) of IPL viewership. The online viewership also increased 1.3 crore unique visitors, which is 18.5 times than of last year's 7 lakh unique visitors. The third season which was flagged off on 30 January, recorded a surge in viewership with the opening week ratings 36 per cent higher than the week one viewership for its last season.

Teams

Stadiums and locations 

Note: Table list in alphabetical order.

PKL season results 
Four teams, U Mumba, Bengaluru Bulls, Bengal Warriors and Dabang Delhi have won the tournament once, and Jaipur Pink Panthers won the tournament twice, while Patna Pirates have won the Pro Kabaddi League thrice and the only champions to have defended their title twice. The current champions
are Jaipur Pink Panthers.

Results

By Season

Performance of all the teams in all seasons

Team records

Sponsorship

Team records

Total points scored

Total points conceded

Average points scored

Successful raids

Raid points

Average raid points (teams)

Successful tackles

Tackle points

Average tackle points (team)

Super raids

Super Tackles

Most Do or Die raid points (teams)

Most all outs inflicted

Most all outs conceded

Tournament statistics

Total points (all seasons)

Best raiders

Most raid points (all seasons)

Most successful raids (all seasons)

Average raid points

Most super raids

Most Do or Die raid points

Most Super 10s (all seasons)

Fastest to multiples of 500 raid points

Best defenders

Most tackle points (all seasons)

Most successful tackles (all seasons)

Average tackle points

Most Super Tackles (all seasons)

Most high 5s

Most Matches Played

Prize money 
Prize money for the winner of season 6 was ₹3 crore. The first and second runners-up were awarded ₹1.80
crore and ₹1.20 crore respectively.
The consolidated prize money for season 7 is ₹8 crore. The champions of season 7 will bag ₹3 crore while the runners-up will receive ₹1.8 crore. The losing semifinalists will receive ₹90 lakh each and, the fifth and the sixth-placed teams will earn ₹45 lakh.

See also 
 Sports in India
 Ultimate Kho Kho

References

External links
 

 
Sports leagues established in 2014
2014 establishments in India
Kabaddi
Kabaddi competitions
Kabaddi in India